Lyme Township is one of the nineteen townships of Huron County, Ohio, United States. As of the 2010 census the population of the township was 853, down from 968 at the 2000 census.

Geography
Located in the northwestern corner of the county, it borders the following townships:
Groton Township, Erie County - north
Oxford Township, Erie County - northeast corner
Ridgefield Township - east
Peru Township - southeast corner
Sherman Township - south
Thompson Township, Seneca County - southwest
York Township, Sandusky County - northwest

It is the only township in the county to border Sandusky County.

The city of Bellevue borders the northwestern portion of Lyme Township, and the unincorporated community of Hunts Corners lies in the township's southeastern corner.

Name and history
It is the only Lyme Township statewide.

Settlement of Lyme Township began in 1808.  Three years later, the "Sutton Settlement" (now Hunts Corners) was established in the southeastern portion of the county.

National Register of Historic Places
The John Wright Mansion, located on State Route 113, was listed on the National Register of Historic Places on February 27, 1974.  In 1993, the entirety of Hunts Corners was listed on the Register as a historic district.

Government
The township is governed by a three-member board of trustees, who are elected in November of odd-numbered years to a four-year term beginning on the following January 1. Two are elected in the year after the presidential election and one is elected in the year before it. There is also an elected township fiscal officer, who serves a four-year term beginning on April 1 of the year after the election, which is held in November of the year before the presidential election. Vacancies in the fiscal officership or on the board of trustees are filled by the remaining trustees.  In 2009, the board was composed of Roger Hunker, David Lepley, and Michael C. Nottke, and the fiscal officer was Deborah Hawkins.

References

External links
Lyme Township official website
County website

Historic Lyme Village
Margie Pfund Memorial Post Mark Museum and Research Library

Townships in Huron County, Ohio
Populated places established in 1808
Townships in Ohio